Santa Fe is a municipality in the Honduran department of Colón.

Notable people from Santa Fe include Miriam Miranda, a Honduran human rights activist who advocates for the land rights of the Garífuna people.

References

Municipalities of Honduras
Municipalities of the Colón Department (Honduras)